Kamuzu Central Hospital is a tertiary referral hospital in the city of Lilongwe, (capital of Malawi). It is estimated to have 780 beds, although the true number of patients always exceeds the number of beds. It serves approximately 5 million people, referred from five district hospitals and from other parts of Malawi and parts of neighboring Tanzania, Zambia, Mozambique and Zimbabwe.

Location
The hospital is located in an area of the city of Lilongwe called Area 33 (also Nangwagwa), south of the Lingazi Namilomba Forest Reserve and the Lilongwe Wildlife Centre; adjacent to Kamuzu College of Nursing. The geographical coordinates of the hospital are:13°58'37.0"S,  33°47'11.0"E (Latitude:-13.976944; Longitude:33.786389).

Overview
Kamuzu Central Hospital is a large referral hospital that serves as the referral hospital for the Central Region of Malawi. It is the referral hospital for about 5 million people. As of May 2020, it had about 60 doctors and about 300 nurses. As of 2019, the hospital admitted as many as 25,000 children annually. That is an average of about 70 children daily.

In April 2012, the late Bingu wa Mutharika (24 February 1934 – 5 April 2012), the third President of Malawi was admitted to Kamuzu Central Hospital and was diagnosed with cardiac arrest.

History
The hospital was built in 1977 by the Danish International Development Agency (DANIDA), with money provided by the government of Denmark. Political problems cropped up before the hospital was complete. Only the first phase was finished.

The departments that were left out included (a) Obstetrics & Gynecology including Antenatal care (b) Orthopedics (c) Psychiatry and (d) Tuberculosis unit.

From 1977 until 2004, the hospital was known as Lilongwe Central Hospital. In 2004, it rebranded to its current name.

Collaboration and partnerships
Kamuzu Central Hospital has a partnership with the University of North Carolina. The objective of the collaboration is to "identify innovative, culturally acceptable, and affordable methods to improve the health of the people of Malawi, through research, capacity building, and care".

The hospital also receives support from Baylor Pediatric AIDS Initiative (BIPAI). Additional support came from the German Hospital Partnership MAGNET, administered through the German Corporation for International Cooperation GmbH (GIZ). Funding continued until 2015, having started in 2008.

See also
 List of hospitals in Malawi

References

External links
The Halls of Kamuzu Central Hospital As of 4 August 2007.
Self-directed e-learning at a tertiary hospital in Malawi – A qualitative Evaluation and Lessons learnt Article (PDF Available) in German medical science : GMS e-journal 32(1) · February 2015 with 635 Reads. 
 Hospital Partnership MAGNET: Malawi German Networking for Capacity Building in Treatment, Training and Research at Kamuzu Central Hospital (KCH), Lilongwe, Malawi Conference Paper (PDF Available) · November 2014 with 444 Reads. 

Buildings and structures in Lilongwe
Hospitals in Malawi
Hospitals established in 1977
Buildings and structures completed in 1977
1977 establishments in Malawi
Lilongwe District